The Costello Album, also The McCartney/MacManus Collaboration, is a Paul McCartney album that includes work from his 1987–88 songwriting collaboration with Elvis Costello. The album includes demo recordings made by Paul and Elvis in the throes of their collaboration, other demos of some songs by Costello and McCartney individually, live performances by Costello, and two duo live performances taken from a 1995 benefit concert at the Royal College of Music. A planned album credited to both was abandoned, initial work-ups appearing in the 2017 deluxe edition reissue to McCartney's Flowers in the Dirt. These recordings were unknown to the public until 1998 when they surfaced as an unofficial compact disc titled The McCartney/MacManus Collaboration.

Studio recordings of many of these songs have appeared officially on albums by either McCartney or Costello. "Back on My Feet" was the first collaboration to be released officially, as a B-side to McCartney's 1987 single "Once Upon a Long Ago." McCartney went on to release his versions of "My Brave Face," "You Want Her Too," "Don't Be Careless Love," and "That Day Is Done" on Flowers in the Dirt in 1989, followed by "Mistress and Maid" and "The Lovers That Never Were" on Off the Ground in 1993. Costello issued his versions of "Veronica" and "Pads, Paws, and Claws" on Spike in 1989, "So Like Candy" and "Playboy to a Man" on Mighty Like a Rose in 1991, and "Shallow Grave" on All This Useless Beauty in 1996. Demos of these songs have appeared as bonus tracks to the above albums, on bonus discs to the Costello Rhino reissues, and on the bonus discs to the 2017 reissue of Flowers in the Dirt.

Track listings

Paul McCartney and Elvis Costello live

Elvis Costello live

Sources

Paul McCartney live albums
Elvis Costello live albums
Collaborative albums
Demo albums